The October 2020 Afghanistan attacks were multiple attacks launched by insurgents including the Taliban and Islamic State of Iraq and the Levant – Khorasan Province in October 2020. The attacks left at least 243 people dead and 339 injured. 10 perpetrators were also killed in these attacks.

Timeline of attacks

See also
 2020 in Afghanistan
 List of Islamist terrorist attacks
 List of mass car bombings
 List of terrorist attacks in Kabul
 List of terrorist incidents in 2020
 List of terrorist incidents linked to ISIL
 May 2020 Afghanistan attacks
 June 2020 Afghanistan attacks
 July 2020 Afghanistan attacks
 August 2020 Afghanistan attacks
 September 2020 Afghanistan attacks
 November 2020 Afghanistan attacks

References

2020 in Kabul
October attacks
21st-century mass murder in Afghanistan
21st century in Faryab Province
21st century in Ghazni Province
21st century in Ghor Province
21st century in Helmand Province
21st century in Herat Province
21st century in Kapisa Province
21st century in Khost Province
21st century in Kunduz Province
21st century in Laghman Province
21st century in Maidan Wardak Province
21st century in Nangarhar Province
21st century in Nimruz Province
21st century in Sar-e Pol Province
21st century in Takhar Province
October 2020 attacks
Crime in Ghazni Province
Crime in Helmand Province
Crime in Herat Province
Crime in Khost Province
Crime in Kunduz Province
Crime in Nangarhar Province
Improvised explosive device bombings in 2020
ISIL terrorist incidents in Afghanistan
Khost
Mass murder in 2020
Mass murder in Kabul
October 2020 crimes in Asia
October 2020 events in Afghanistan
Suicide bombings in 2020
Suicide bombings in Kabul
October 2020 attacks
Taliban attacks
October attacks
Terrorism in Afghanistan
Islamic terrorism in Afghanistan
Islamic terrorist incidents in 2020